Streptopetalum is a genus of flowering plants belonging to the family Passifloraceae.

Its native range is Eritrea to Southern Africa.

Species
Species:

Streptopetalum arenarium 
Streptopetalum graminifolium 
Streptopetalum hildebrandtii 
Streptopetalum luteoglandulosum 
Streptopetalum serratum 
Streptopetalum wittei

References

Passifloraceae
Malpighiales genera